Santa Rita National Forest was established as the Santa Rita Forest Reserve by the General Land Office in Arizona on April 11, 1902 with . After the transfer of federal forests to the U.S. Forest Service in 1905, it became a National Forest on March 4, 1907. On July 1, 1908 it was combined with Santa Catalina National Forest and Dragoon National Forest to create Coronado National Forest and the name was discontinued.

The forest included the Santa Rita Mountains in Pima County and Santa Cruz County, and is part of the Nogales Ranger District of Coronado.

References

External links
 Forest History Society
 Forest History Society: Listing of the National Forests of the United States Text from Davis, Richard C., ed. Encyclopedia of American Forest and Conservation History. New York: Macmillan Publishing Company for the Forest History Society, 1983. Vol. II, pp. 743–788.

  

Former National Forests of Arizona
Coronado National Forest
1902 establishments in Arizona Territory
Protected areas established in 1902
Protected areas disestablished in 1908
1908 disestablishments in Arizona Territory